Zuzana Nemšáková (born 14 September 1976) is a Slovak former professional tennis player.

Nemšáková, a Wimbledon junior semi-finalist, competed on the professional tour during the 1990s and reached a best singles ranking of 272 in the world. She made her only WTA Tour main draw appearance at the Prague Open in 1992, where she was beaten in the first round of the singles by Noëlle van Lottum.

ITF finals

Singles: 4 (2–2)

Doubles: 8 (2–6)

References

External links
 
 

1976 births
Living people
Slovak female tennis players
Czechoslovak female tennis players